Keith Wayne Colwell (born October 3, 1947) is a Canadian politician, who served as a member of the Nova Scotia House of Assembly, representing the riding of Preston-Dartmouth for the Nova Scotia Liberal Party, from 1993 to 1999 and from 2003 to 2021.

Early life
Colwell was raised in Jemseg, New Brunswick. Since the 1990s, he has owned and operated a manufacturing company and was one of the founding members of the Enterprise Forum for Nova Scotia.

Political career
Colwell successfully ran for the Liberal nomination in the riding of Eastern Shore in spring 1993.  He was elected in the 1993 provincial election and was re-elected in the 1998 provincial election. Following his re-election, Colwell was appointed to the Executive Council of Nova Scotia where he served as Minister for Fisheries and Aquaculture, Minister of Consumer Services, as well as holding other cabinet responsibilities.

Colwell was defeated in the 1999 provincial election by Bill Dooks.  Turning to municipal politics, Colwell was elected to Halifax Regional Council on October 30, 1999, in a by-election for the Halifax Regional Municipality where he represented District 3 (Preston/Porters Lake).  Colwell was re-elected in District 3 in the 2000 municipal general election.

Colwell successfully ran for the Liberal nomination in the riding of Preston and was elected in the 2003 provincial election.   He was re-elected in the 2006 and 2009 provincial elections.  The riding name was changed in 2013 to Preston-Dartmouth and he was re-elected in the 2013 provincial election.

Colwell was honoured for his efforts in successfully banning the burning of tires in Nova Scotia and has been a volunteer fireman with 13 years of experience.

In May 2013, Colwell was allegedly the victim of an assault by Percy Paris, a fellow member of the Legislative Assembly of Nova Scotia. "Yesterday in the house of assembly, I was assaulted and threatened by the minister of economic and rural development and tourism," Colwell said in a statement. "This improper behaviour by the minister was quite clearly an execution of a threat and intimidation, an attempt to prevent me from performing my function as a legislator, elected representative for my constituents and member of this assembly." Paris was charged with assault and uttering threats.

On October 22, 2013, Colwell was appointed to the Executive Council of Nova Scotia where he serves as Minister of Fisheries and Aquaculture, Minister of Agriculture, Minister responsible for Part II of the Gaming Control Act, as well as Minister responsible for the Maritime Provinces Harness Racing Commission Act.

Personal life
He and his wife Elizabeth currently live in Porters Lake.

Electoral record

|-

|Liberal
|Keith Colwell
|align="right"|3,326 
|align="right"|58.39
|align="right"|
|-

|New Democratic Party
|André Cain
|align="right"|1,816
|align="right"|31.88
|align="right"| 
|-

|Progressive Conservative
|Andrew J. Mecke
|align="right"|554
|align="right"|9.73
|align="right"|
|}

|-

|Liberal
|Keith Colwell
|align="right"|1908
|align="right"|42.20
|align="right"|
|-

|New Democratic Party
|Janet Sutcliffe
|align="right"|1316
|align="right"|29.11
|align="right"|
|-

|Progressive Conservative
|Dwayne Provo
|align="right"|1240
|align="right"|27.43
|align="right"|
|-

|}

|-

|Liberal
|Keith Colwell
|align="right"|1853
|align="right"|42.13
|align="right"|
|-

|Progressive Conservative
|Dwayne Provo
|align="right"|1610
|align="right"|36.83
|align="right"|
|-

|New Democratic Party
|Douglas Sparks
|align="right"|843
|align="right"|19.17
|align="right"|
|-

|}

|-

|Liberal
|Keith Colwell
|align="right"|1411
|align="right"|33.90
|align="right"|
|-

|Progressive Conservative
|David Hensbee
|align="right"|1361
|align="right"|32.92
|align="right"|
|-

|New Democratic Party
|Douglas Sparks
|align="right"|1331
|align="right"|31.97
|align="right"|
|-

|}

|-
 
|Progressive Conservative
|Bill Dooks
|align="right"|3637
|align="right"|
|align="right"|
|-
 
|Liberal
|Keith Colwell
|align="right"|2695
|align="right"|
|align="right"|
|-
 
|New Democratic Party
|Mary-Alice Tzagarakis
|align="right"|1970
|align="right"|
|align="right"|

|}

|-
 
|Liberal
|Keith Colwell
|align="right"|3,760
|align="right"|
|align="right"|
|-
 
|Progressive Conservative
|Tom McInnes
|align="right"|3,523
|align="right"|
|align="right"|
|-
 
|New Democratic Party
|Gary Moore
|align="right"|1,369
|align="right"|
|align="right"|
|}

References

External links
 Members of the Nova Scotia Legislative Assembly
 Liberal caucus profile

Living people
Nova Scotia Liberal Party MLAs
1947 births
Members of the Executive Council of Nova Scotia
People from Queens County, New Brunswick
Halifax Regional Municipality councillors
21st-century Canadian politicians